1,2-Dichloro-4-nitrobenzene is an organic compound with the formula 1,2-ClCH-4-NO.  This pale yellow solid is related to 1,2-dichlorobenzene by the replacement of one H atom with a nitro functional group.  This compound is an intermediate in the synthesis of agrochemicals.

Production and uses
The nitration of  1,2-dichlorobenzene mainly produces 1,2-dichloro-4-nitrobenzene, together with smaller amounts of the 3-nitro isomer. It can also be prepared by chlorination of 1-chloro-4-nitrobenzene.

One of the chlorides is reactive toward nucleophiles.  Potassium fluoride gives 2-chloro-1-fluoro-4-nitrobenzene, an intermediate in the production of herbicides.  With ammonia, one obtains 2-chloro-4-nitroaniline, a precursor to diazo dyes. Reduction with iron powder gives 3,4-dichloroaniline (m.p. 72 °C, CAS# 95-76-1).

References

Nitrobenzenes
Chlorobenzenes